Cycling at the 1934 British Empire Games was the first appearance of Cycling at the Commonwealth Games. The events took place at the Fallowfield Stadium in Manchester despite the Games being hosted by London. The events were held on the last day of the Games on 11 August 1934.

Medal table

Medal winners

Results

1,000m Time Trial

10 mile scratch race

1,000 yards sprint championship
Heat 1

Heat 2

Heat 3

Semi final 1

Semi final 2

Final

References

See also
List of Commonwealth Games medallists in cycling
Cycling at the Commonwealth Games

Cycling at the Commonwealth Games
1934 British Empire Games events